Ahammad Devarkovil is an Indian politician from Indian National League. He is currently serving as the MLA of Kozhikode South constituency since May 2021. He is the Minister of Ports, Museums, Archaeology and Archive in Second Pinarayi Vijayan Ministry.

Life 
In 1977, he was tenth standard student at Kuttyadi High School. He was the school leader as well. He was arrested for writing an essay in a school magazine against the internal emergency. It was only in 1980, he could finish his tenth standard education, but from Govt. High School, Kalliyadu.

Political career 
Ahammad Devarkovil started his political life in the Muslim Students Federation during his school days. He was once the district secretary of MSF in Kozhikode district. He was active in Indian Union Muslim League as well. Later, he joined Indian National League.

In 2021 Kerala Assembly Election, Ahammad Devarkovil defeated IUML's Adv. Noorbeena Rasheed by a margin of 12,459 votes at Kozhikode South assembly constituency.

References 

Kerala MLAs 2021–2026
Year of birth missing (living people)
Living people